La Gohannière is a former commune in the Manche department in north-western France. On 1 January 2019, it was merged into the new commune of Tirepied-sur-Sée.

See also
Communes of the Manche department

References 

Gohanniere